Rustam Vladimirovich Balov (born 3 February 1986) is a former Russian professional footballer.

Club career
He made his professional debut in the Russian First Division in 2003 for PFC Spartak Nalchik.

External links

References

1986 births
Living people
Russian footballers
Association football midfielders
PFC Spartak Nalchik players
FC Metallurg Lipetsk players
FC Chernomorets Novorossiysk players
FC Volgar Astrakhan players
Russian Premier League players